Kiril Marinov Semov (23 May 1930 – 23 November 2001) was a Bulgarian basketball player. He competed in the men's tournament at the 1952 Summer Olympics.

References

External links

1930 births
2001 deaths
Bulgarian men's basketball players
Olympic basketball players of Bulgaria
Basketball players at the 1952 Summer Olympics
Place of birth missing